Nagpuri (also known as Sadri) is an Indo-Aryan language spoken in the Indian states of Jharkhand,  Chhattisgarh, Odisha and Bihar. It is primarily spoken in the west and central Chota Nagpur plateau region. It is sometimes  considered a dialect of Bhojpuri.

It is native language of the Sadan, the Indo-Aryan ethnic group of Chota Nagpur plateau. In addition to native speakers, it is also used as lingua franca by many tribal groups such as Kurukh, a Dravidian ethnic group and Kharia, Munda, the Austro-asiatic ethnic groups and a number of speakers of these tribal groups have adopted it as their first language. It is also used  as a lingua franca among Tea-garden community of Assam, West Bengal and Bangladesh who were taken as a labourers to work in tea gardens during British Period. It is known as Baganiya bhasa in tea garden area of Assam which is influenced by Assamese language. According to the 2011 Census, It is spoken by 5.1 million people as first language. Around 7 million speak it as their second language based on study in 2007.

Names
The language is known by several names, such as Nagpuri, Nagpuria, Sadani,  Sadri etc. The language is known as Sadani, the native language of Sadan, the Indo-Aryan ethnolinguistic group of Chotanagpur. The Sadani also refer to closely related  Indo-Aryan languages of Jharkhand such as Nagpuri, Panchpargania, Kurmali and Khortha. In literary tradition, the language is known as Nagpuri, which is the polished and literary language especially used by Hindus and in cities. Sadri refers to the spoken and non-literary form of the language, 
especially spoken by tribals in the countryside. The name Nagpur is the region ruled by Nagvanshi, named as Chutia Nagpur (Chota Nagpur Division) by the British to distinguish it from Nagpur of Maharashtra. 

Nagpuri language writers are in favour of using Nagpuri as the name of the language. There is an opposition against the use of the word Sadri and giving two names Sadan/Sadri and Nagpuria, to a single language in the upcoming Indian census. According to them, the name of the language is Nagpuri and the native speakers of the language are known as Nagpuria. The British also wrote grammar using the name Nagpuri in 1906 and Nagpuri is the official name of the language in Jhakhand.

History
There are different opinions among linguists about the origin of the Nagpuri language. According to Peter Shanti Navrangi, Nagpuriya Sadani or Nagpuri originated from ancient Prakrit. According to professor Keshri Kumar Singh, Nagpuri is an Apabhramsha and descendant of  Magadhi Prakrit in his book "Nagpuri bhasa ebam Sahitya". According to Dr. Shravan Kumar Goswami, Nagpuri evolved from Ardhamagadhi Prakrit.
According to him, Nagpuri might have originated between the 8th to 11th centuries and developed into a full-fledged language between the 14th to 15th centuries. According to Yogendra Nath Tiwari, Nagpuri is an ancient language that was in existence before Chotanagpur or Jharkhand started to be known as Nagpur and evolved from Jharkhand Prakrit. There is no consensus among scholars from which language Nagpuri has evolved. Several similarities are found between the words of Hindi, Nagpuri, Apabrahmsa, Prakrit and Sanskrit. 

The Nagpuri language was the court language of the Nagvanshi dynasty and the official language of Chotanagpur till British rule. Evidence of literature is available from the 17th century. In 1903, Sir George Abraham Grierson classified Nagpuri as the Nagpuria dialect of the Bhojpuri language in his "Linguistic Survey of India". 

Nagpuri has been placed in the Bihari group of Indo-Aryan languages. Recent studies demonstrate that the Indo-Aryan languages of the Chota Nagpur plateau, called Sadani languages, are distinct languages and are more closely related to each other than any other languages.

Geographical Distribution
The Nagpuri language is mainly spoken in the western Chota Nagpur Plateau region. The geographical distribution of language is tabulated below;

It is also spoken by some Tea garden community in Tea garden area of Assam, West Bengal, Bangladesh and Nepal who were taken as labourer to work in Tea garden during British Rule.

Dialects
The Nagpuri language spoken in different districts such as Ranchi, Gumla, Simdega and Garhwa varies with each other.

Script
The early inscriptions found in the region are in Brahmi script. The Saridkel Brahmi Inscription from Khunti district is from 3rd century BCE. Several inscriptions of forts, temples and land grants are found from the 9th century, such as from Mahamaya temple of Hapamuni built by Gajghat Rai, Nagfeni, Navratangarh fort of Gumla district, Boreya and Jagannath temple of Ranchi. Some Buddhist inscriptions are undated, such as from Khalari and Jonha Falls. Inscriptions of the modern period are in Devnagari script. Nagpuri poetry has been written in Devnagari and Kaithi script during the 17th century. At present, mainly Devnagari script is used in literature.

Status
Historically, Nagpuri was the lingua-franca in the region. It was the court language during the reign of the Nagvanshi dynasty. Nagpuri is accorded as an additional official language in the Indian state of Jharkhand. There is demand to include Nagpuri in the Eighth schedule. Some academics oppose inclusion of Hindi dialects in the Eighth Schedule of the Constitution as full-fledged Indian languages. According to them, recognition of Hindi dialects as separate languages would deprive Hindi of millions of its speakers and eventually no Hindi will be left.

Literature

The Nagpuri language is rich in folk tales, folk songs and riddles. Literature in the Nagpuri language are available since the 17th century. The Nagvanshi king Raghunath Shah and the King of Ramgarh, Dalel Singh, were  poets. These poems were composed in Devnagari script and Kaithi script. Some Nagpuri peots were Hanuman Singh, Jaigovind Mishra, Barju Ram Pathak, Ghasi Ram Mahli, Das Mahli, Mahant Ghasi and Kanchan. "Nagvanshavali" (1876), written by Beniram Mehta, is a historical work in the nagpuri language. The poet Ghasi Ram Mahli wrote several works, including "Nagvanashavali", "Durgasaptasati", "Barahamasa", "Vivha Parichhan" etc. There were also great writers like Pradumn Das and Rudra Singh. 
It is believed that prose writing in the nagpuri language started by Christian missionaries. E.H.Whitley wrote Notes on the Ganwari dialect of Lohardaga, Chhota Nagpur in 1896, which considered the start of writing prose in the nagpuri language. 
Some Nagpuri language writers and poets in the modern period are Praful Kumar Rai, Sahani Upendra Pal Singh, Shiv Avtar Choudhary, Lal Ranvijay Nath Shahdeo, Bisheshwar Prasad Keshari and Girdhari Ram Gonjhu.

Monthly Nagpuri magazines Gotiya and Johar Sahiya have been published in Ranchi. Several magazines have also been published in Assam, West Bengal's Tarai and Dooars districts.

Author and Work
Some poets, writers and their works in the nagpuri language are as follows:

Education
Nagpuri taught at some high schools as a subject in Jharkhand.
It is also taught at Ranchi University, Dr. Shyama Prasad Mukherjee University, Ranchi Women's College, Suraj Singh Memorial College, J.N College, Ram Lakhan Singh Yadav College, Doranda College, Simdega College and other universities of Jharkhand.

Phonology

Consonants 

  can be voiced as  when between vowels.
  can be heard as taps  when in word-medial position.
  can also be heard as retroflex  when after back vowels.

Vowels 

  can be heard as more close  in free variation within word-final syllables.
  can be heard as front  or central  in free variation.

Vocabulary

Similarities between words
There are similarities between the words of Nagpuri, Hindi, Apabhramsha, Prakrit and Sanskrit which are given in the table below.

Tenses
Magadhi, Nagpuri and Jharkhand Prakrit use “la” in the past tense, “ta” in  the present tense and  “ma” in the future tense. The words are given below in the table.

Relationship
Below are some words about relationships in Nagpuri in the table.

Words
Below are some words of daily use in Nagpuri, Hindi and English in the table.

Sample phrases

Alternate names
Alternate names of language include: Sadani, Sadana, Sadati, Sadari, Sadhan, Sadna, Sadrik, Santri, Siddri, Sradri, Sadhari, Sadan, Nagpuria, Chota Nagpuri, Dikku Kaji, Gawari, Ganwari, Goari, Gauuari, Jharkhandhi.

See also
Nagpuri culture
Nagpuri cinema

References

Bihari languages
Eastern Indo-Aryan languages
Indo-Aryan languages
Languages of Jharkhand
Languages of Odisha
Languages of West Bengal
Languages of Bangladesh
Nagpuri language
Nagpuri culture